Lightning Guns is a 1950 American Western film directed by Fred F. Sears and starring Charles Starrett, Gloria Henry and William Bailey. The film is part of Columbia's long-running Durango Kid series.

It was shot at the Iverson Ranch with art direction by Charles Clague.

Cast
 Charles Starrett as Steve Brandon / Durango Kid 
 Gloria Henry as Susan Atkins 
 William Bailey as Luke Atkins 
 Edgar Dearing as Capt. Dan Saunders 
 Raymond Bond as Jud Norton 
 Jock Mahoney as Sheriff Rob Saunders 
 Ken Houchins as Ken Houchins - Guitar Player 
 Smiley Burnette as Smiley Burnette

References

Bibliography
 Pitts, Michael R. Western Movies: A Guide to 5,105 Feature Films. McFarland, 2012.

External links
 

1950 films
1950 Western (genre) films
American Western (genre) films
Films directed by Fred F. Sears
Columbia Pictures films
American black-and-white films
1950s English-language films
1950s American films